Onepoto Bridge is a  long pedestrian and cyclist bridge crossing the tidal stream outlet of the Onepoto volcanic crater in Northcote, Auckland.

The bridge became necessary after widening of Onewa Road towards State Highway 1 made the existing bridge too narrow to carry footpaths. After deciding to build a new bridge, North Shore City Council resolved to construct an iconic structure that would create "architecture integrated into the landscape". This resulting in the bridge structure being encased with wooden curved 'ribs' that have been described as a whale skeleton, a wave or a half-finished sailing ship. The bridge was designed by Beca Group.

The bridge is also part of North Shore City's strategic cycle route network and incorporated into works to better access the local estuarial area for the community.

References

External links 
Proposed Onewa Rd Pedestrian/Cycle Bridge and Pathway (official project webpage of the North Shore City Council)

Pedestrian bridges in New Zealand
Cyclist bridges in New Zealand
Bridges in Auckland
North Shore, New Zealand
Bridges completed in 2008
2000s architecture in New Zealand
Transport buildings and structures in the Auckland Region